Louis  J. Roussel III, known as Louie Roussel (born January 13, 1946, in New Orleans, Louisiana), is an American businessman and a Thoroughbred racehorse owner and trainer who owned Fair Grounds Race Course and who won the final two legs of the 1988 U.S. Triple Crown series with Risen Star, a colt later voted the Eclipse Award as the American Champion Three-Year-Old Male Horse.

Widely known as "Louie," he was the son of Louis J. Roussel Jr., and the former Lucy Cocchiarra. He graduated in 1967 from Louisiana State University in Baton Rouge and then in 1970 from the law school at Loyola University New Orleans. While still in college, he took out his Thoroughbred trainer's license. Except at the beginning, he has trained only his own horses or those he owns in a partnership.

References

1946 births
Living people
Louisiana State University alumni
Loyola University New Orleans College of Law alumni
Louisiana lawyers
American bankers
American horse trainers
American racehorse owners and breeders
Owners of Belmont Stakes winners
Owners of Preakness Stakes winners
Businesspeople from New Orleans